Ciena Alipio (born March 7, 2004) is an American artistic gymnast and former member of the United States women's national gymnastics team.  She currently competes in NCAA gymnastics for the UCLA Bruins.

Early life 
Alipio was born to Linda and Dante Alipio in 2004 in San Jose, California.  She has one brother, Eric.  Alpio's mother's side of the family is from the Navajo Nation.

Gymnastics career

J.O. & HOPEs

2015–16 
In 2015 Alipio was part of the Junior Olympic Program and competed at various HOPEs competitions.  She competed at the 2015 HOPES Championships where she placed first on the balance, second in the all-around and on floor exercise, sixth on uneven bars, and eighth on vault.  In 2016 she competed at the 2016 Women's Junior Olympic National Championships where she placed second on floor exercise.  She also competed at the 2016 Hopes Classic where she placed first in the all-around and at 2016 Hopes Championships where she placed first on balance beam and second in the all-around.

Junior Elite

2017 
In 2017 Alipio qualified for junior elite status at the Brestyans National Qualifier.  She made her elite debut at the American Classic where she placed 11th in the all-around.  In late July she competed at the 2017 U.S. Classic where she placed 16th in the all-around.  She ended the season competing at the 2017 U.S. National Gymnastics Championships where she placed 21st in the all-around.

2018 
In early July, Alipio competed at the American Classic where she placed ninth in the all-around.  Later that month she competed at the 2018 U.S. Classic where she placed 17th in the all-around.  In August Alipio competed at the 2018 U.S. National Gymnastics Championships.  She finished sixteenth in the all-around but won silver on balance beam, finishing behind Konnor McClain.

2019 
In February, Alipio was named to the team to compete at the 2019 City of Jesolo Trophy in Italy, her first international assignment, alongside Kayla DiCello, Konnor McClain, and Sophia Butler.  As a result, she was added onto the junior national team.  While there she helped the USA win team silver behind Russia and individually she won silver on balance beam behind Russian Viktoria Listunova, bronze on vault behind McClain and Listunova, and placed eighth in the all-around.

In June Alipio competed at the Junior World Championships Trials where she placed fifth in the all-around, but placed first on balance beam and third on uneven bars; however she was not named to team.  Later that month she competed at the American Classic where she won gold in the all-around and on uneven bars, and placed second on balance beam.  In July Alipio competed at the U.S. Classic where she finished fifth in the all-around behind Konnor McClain, Sydney Barros, Olivia Greaves, and Skye Blakely.  She won silver on the balance beam behind McClain, placed tenth on vault, and eleventh on uneven bars and floor exercise.

Senior elite

2021–22 
In November 2021 Alipio made her senior international debut at the Arthur Gander Memorial in Morges, Switzerland.  She placed third in the three-event all-around behind Angelina Melnikova of Russia and Taïs Boura of France.

In August 2022 Alipio competed at the National Championships.  She finished second on balance beam behind Konnor McClain.

NCAA

2022–2023 season 
Alipio made her debut for the UCLA Bruins on January 7, 2023 at the Super 16 Invitational.

Competitive History

References

External links
 
 

2004 births
Living people
American female artistic gymnasts
Sportspeople from San Jose, California
U.S. women's national team gymnasts
UCLA Bruins women's gymnasts
Navajo sportspeople
21st-century American women